Sussex Records, Inc. was a Los Angeles-based record label, founded by music executive and businessman Clarence Avant, that existed from 1969 through 1975.

History
Sussex Records was launched in December 1969 by Avant, who had previously set up another mainly black music label, Venture Records for MGM. An offshoot of Buddah Records, initially it was located at 6430 W Sunset Blvd in Hollywood, at the corner of Sunset and Cahuenga Blvds. In 1972, it moved to 6255 W Sunset Blvd, Suite 1902. All records were distributed by Buddah Records until 1974 when Sussex switched to independent distribution until its closure. The company folded in July 1975, due to unpaid state and federal taxes amounting to $62,000: the Internal Revenue Service padlocked the offices and auctioned off all assets. Many of the label's master tapes went missing and were presumed destroyed.

Bill Withers was the label's best-selling artist with a string of pop and R&B hits and several successful albums. They included three million-selling singles, "Ain't No Sunshine" (#3 pop, #6 R&B, 1971), the label's only chart-topper, "Lean On Me" (#1 pop and #1 R&B, 1972) and "Use Me" (#2 pop and #2 R&B, 1972). His recordings, many self-written and produced, were later purchased by Columbia Records, when Withers signed for the label in 1975.

In 1971, the label notched another gold disc with Detroit guitarist Dennis Coffey who reached #6 on the pop charts and #9 on the R&B charts with "Scorpio". The Presidents vocal group had a major hit for Sussex in 1970 with "5-10-15-20" (#5 R&B, #11 pop), produced by Van McCoy. The group from Washington DC had released the label's first single, "For You", a minor R&B hit, a few months earlier.

In 1972 another guitarist was signed named Eddy Senay who had a hit called "Hot Thang"; he also covered the Bill Withers hit "Ain't No Sunshine". Later the hit "Cameo" started to break out worldwide as a popular hit with his fans around the world.

After Sussex folded, Avant went on to form another record company, Tabu Records.

Subsidiary
A subsidiary of Sussex was Clarama Records. It was launched by Clarence Avant in 1974. One act to get in early on the label was Brenda & Albert who were formerly with Faith Hope and Charity.

Sixto Rodriguez
The label is also known for signing American singer-songwriter and guitarist Rodriguez in 1970.

After the move to Sussex, his professional name was changed to simply Rodriguez. Rodriguez recorded and released his two albums, Cold Fact in 1970 and Coming from Reality in 1971. But after both sold poorly in the US, he was quickly dropped.

Though the albums sold poorly in the US; its origin country, the album sold extremely well in South Africa, Australia and surrounding countries. The albums proved very successful and influential eventually being certified platinum and causing a cultural phenomenon. Rodriguez has since remained a mystery artist in his native country of the US but a cultural figure in many others.

Rodriguez found more fame with the release of the 2012 documentary film Searching for Sugar Man a documentary film directed and written by Malik Bendjelloul, which details the efforts in the late 1990s of two Cape Town fans, Stephen "Sugar" Segerman and Craig Bartholomew Strydom, to find out whether the rumoured death of Rodriguez was true and, if not, to discover what had become of him.

Artists
Amish
Willie Bobo
Billy Charne
Dennis Coffey
Priscilla Coolidge-Jones
Creative Source
Zulema Cusseaux 
Dandelion Wine
Gallery
Faith, Hope & Charity
Lonette
Masterfleet
Mutzie
The Presidents
 The Decisions
The Primo People [The Primo Family]
Ralph Graham
Rodriguez
Eddy Senay
Segments of Time
The Soul Searchers
Sun
Wadsworth Mansion
Wednesday
Bill Withers
Yukon

See also
 List of record labels
 Tabu Records

References

External links
 Sussex Album Discography

American record labels
Record labels established in 1970
Record labels disestablished in 1975